Visitation Rites is a live album by saxophonist Tim Berne's Paraphrase which was recorded in Germany in 1996 and released on Berne's Screwgun label.

Reception
The AllMusic review awarded the album 4 stars. In Jazziz, Steve Dollar wrote "The music burns but it also makes sense. Juggling alto and baritone saxophones, Berne zooms between incandescent bits of overblowing and tenderly articulated phrases, upper-register soul crys and thunderclap bursts of notes, while sustaining both formidable drive and cliche-free logic".

Track listing
 "Poetic License" (Tom Rainey) – 19:59  
 "Piano Justice" (Tim Berne) – 30:41  
 "I Can't Wait 'Till Tomorrow" (Drew Gress) – 23:10

Personnel
Tim Berne – alto saxophone, baritone saxophone
Drew Gress – bass
Tom Rainey – drums

References 

1997 live albums
Tim Berne live albums
Screwgun Records live albums